Boodarie Station is a pastoral lease that was once a sheep station but now operates as a cattle station in Western Australia. 

Fred Arunder and Charlie Upton initially took up the Boodarie lease circa 1880. A homestead was also constructed prior to 1880, but a more substantial building completed circa 1910.

The property was exporting wool by sea in 1888, with the natural harbour and landing being regarded as a good place to land cargo.

The property is currently owned by BHP. The company were leasing out the land to Michael Thompson of neighbouring Mundabullangana Station in 2015 to graze his cattle on. Following a series of incidences of poaching and arson in 2015 costing Thompson $100,000, he closed the gates to Mundabullangana and employed guards to keep the public out.

See also
List of ranches and stations
List of pastoral leases in Western Australia

References

Pastoral leases in Western Australia
Stations (Australian agriculture)
Homesteads in Western Australia
Pilbara